Melanie Schnell (born 22 February 1977) is a former professional tennis player from Austria.

Biography
Schnell, a right-handed player from Radstadt, began competing on tour in 1993. She made her grand slam main draw debut at the 1995 Wimbledon Championships, where she had a win over Katerina Maleeva. Aged 18, she broke into the world's top 100 in 1995 and had a peak ranking of 90 the following year. Her best performance on the WTA Tour came at the 1996 Budapest Open, where she was a losing finalist to Ruxandra Dragomir.

She represented the Austria Fed Cup team in one tie, a 1996 World Group playoff against Germany, in which she featured in the dead rubber doubles. Partnering with Barbara Schett, the pair beat Sabine Hack and Christina Singer, to give Austria its only win of the fixture.

Married to tennis player Lars Rehmann, Schnell is now based in Germany. She was previously in a relationship with Italian tennis player Diego Nargiso.

WTA career finals

Singles: 1 (0-1)

ITF finals

Singles (2–2)

Doubles (4–4)

References

External links
 
 
 

1977 births
Living people
Austrian female tennis players
People from Radstadt
Austrian emigrants to Germany
Sportspeople from Salzburg (state)